The 2005–06 New Jersey Devils season was the 32nd season for the National Hockey League franchise that was established on June 11, 1974, and 24th season since the franchise relocated from Colorado prior to the 1982–83 NHL season. It was the team's first season back after the NHL canceled the previous season, due to the 2004–05 NHL lockout. The Devils rallied from a poor first half of the season to win the Atlantic Division title on the last day of the season. For the first time, the Devils defeated the New York Rangers in a playoff series, sweeping their rivals in their opening-round matchup.

Season overview
Many of the Devils' players had played in other leagues while the NHL was inactive due to the lockout. Most notably was Patrik Elias, who missed the first 39 games of the season due to catching Hepatitis A while playing for the Metallurg Magnitogorsk of the Russian Superleague (RSL). With many new rule changes for the 2005–06 season, the Devils had to change their style of play. Martin Brodeur, one of the best puck-handling goalies, could no longer use this to his advantage as before, since restrictions were placed on where goalies could handle the puck. The Devils also lost long-time captain Scott Stevens and his physically punishing style of play to retirement, as well as another longtime defenseman, Scott Niedermayer, to free agency. Eventually, Niedermeyer signed with the Anaheim Ducks, joining his brother, Rob.

In July 2005, the team announced that Head Coach Pat Burns would not return for the season after being diagnosed with cancer for the second time in little more than a year. Assistant Coach Larry Robinson, the team's head coach from 2000 to 2002, was promoted to start the season.

On September 16, 2005, longtime Devils owner John McMullen passed away. In honor of his memory, the Devils jerseys had a small "JM" patch on them. 

The Devils struggled early in the 2005–06 season, ending the 2005 calendar year with a 16–18–5 record. Robinson resigned as head coach on December 19, and Lamoriello moved down to the bench. Once Elias returned from his bout with hepatitis, the team quickly turned around with a nine-game winning streak, finishing 46–27–9 after a season-ending 11-game winning streak capped with a dramatic 4–3 win over the Montreal Canadiens. During that final victory, which clinched the Devils' sixth division title, Brian Gionta set a new team record for goals in a season with 48, topping Pat Verbeek's 46. The win streak to close the year was also an NHL record.

On April 29, 2006, the Devils won their first round Stanley Cup playoff series against the New York Rangers four games to none, extending their winning streak to 15 games and marking the first time the Devils defeated their cross-river rival in a playoff series. The team's season ended in the next round with a 4–1 Game 5 loss to the Carolina Hurricanes, who eventually won the Stanley Cup.

Regular season
The Devils were the most disciplined team in the League, with just 349 power-play opportunities against. They also scored the fewest short-handed goals in the League, with just 3.

Season standings

Playoffs

Eastern Conference Quarterfinals 
The first two games of the series were held at Continental Airlines Arena in New Jersey. The Devils took commanding victories in Games 1 and 2, 6–1 and 4–1, respectively. Games 3 and 4 were held at Madison Square Garden. The Devils won Game 3 (3–0) and swept the series in Game 4 by a score of 4–2.

Eastern Conference Semifinals 
The series opened at RBC Center in Raleigh. The Hurricanes won Game 1, 6–0, and Game 2, 3–2, in overtime. Games 3 and 4 shifted to Continental Airlines Arena. The Hurricanes took a 3–2 win in Game 3, but the Devils won 5–1 in Game 4. Game 5 shifted back to Raleigh and Carolina beat New Jersey 4–1, winning the series 4–1.

Schedule and results

Preseason

|- align="center" bgcolor=#CCFFCC
| 1|| September 25, 2005 || 3–2 SO || New York Islanders || 1–0–0
|- align="center" bgcolor=#CCFFCC
| 2|| September 27, 2005 || 3–1 || New York Rangers || 2–0–0
|- align="center" bgcolor=#FFBBBB
| 3|| September 29, 2005 || 2–3 || @ Philadelphia Flyers || 2–1–0
|- align="center" bgcolor=#CCFFCC
| 4|| September 30, 2005 || 5–3 || Philadelphia Flyers || 3–1–0
|- align="center" bgcolor=#FFBBBB
| 5|| October 2, 2005 || 2–3 || @ New York Rangers || 3–2–0
|-

|-
| Legend:

Regular season

|- align="center" bgcolor="#CCFFCC" 
|1||W||October 5, 2005||5–1 || align="left"|  Pittsburgh Penguins (2005–06) ||1–0–0 || 
|- align="center" bgcolor="#FFBBBB"
|2||L||October 7, 2005||2–5 || align="left"| @ Philadelphia Flyers (2005–06) ||1–1–0 || 
|- align="center" bgcolor="#CCFFCC" 
|3||W||October 8, 2005||3–2 OT|| align="left"|  New York Rangers (2005–06) ||2–1–0 || 
|- align="center" bgcolor="#FFBBBB"
|4||L||October 13, 2005||1–4 || align="left"| @ New York Rangers (2005–06) ||2–2–0 || 
|- align="center" bgcolor="#FFBBBB"
|5||L||October 15, 2005||1–6 || align="left"|  Carolina Hurricanes (2005–06) ||2–3–0 || 
|- align="center" bgcolor="#CCFFCC" 
|6||W||October 18, 2005||4–3 || align="left"|  Florida Panthers (2005–06) ||3–3–0 || 
|- align="center" bgcolor="#CCFFCC" 
|7||W||October 20, 2005||6–3 || align="left"| @ Pittsburgh Penguins (2005–06) ||4–3–0 || 
|- align="center" bgcolor="#FFBBBB"
|8||L||October 22, 2005||3–4 || align="left"| @ Atlanta Thrashers (2005–06) ||4–4–0 || 
|- align="center" bgcolor="#FFBBBB"
|9||L||October 26, 2005||3–6 || align="left"|  Tampa Bay Lightning (2005–06) ||4–5–0 || 
|- align="center" bgcolor="#CCFFCC" 
|10||W||October 28, 2005||3–2 || align="left"|  Buffalo Sabres (2005–06) ||5–5–0 || 
|- align="center" bgcolor="#CCFFCC" 
|11||W||October 29, 2005||5–4 SO|| align="left"| @ Boston Bruins (2005–06) ||6–5–0 || 
|-

|- align="center" 
|12||L||November 1, 2005||3–4 OT|| align="left"|  Pittsburgh Penguins (2005–06) ||6–5–1 || 
|- align="center" bgcolor="#FFBBBB"
|13||L||November 3, 2005||2–4 || align="left"|  New York Rangers (2005–06) ||6–6–1 || 
|- align="center" 
|14||L||November 5, 2005||2–3 SO|| align="left"| @ New York Rangers (2005–06) ||6–6–2 || 
|- align="center" bgcolor="#FFBBBB"
|15||L||November 8, 2005||1–4 || align="left"|  New York Islanders (2005–06) ||6–7–2 || 
|- align="center" bgcolor="#CCFFCC" 
|16||W||November 11, 2005||4–3 || align="left"| @ Washington Capitals (2005–06) ||7–7–2 || 
|- align="center" bgcolor="#CCFFCC" 
|17||W||November 12, 2005||3–2 || align="left"|  Washington Capitals (2005–06) ||8–7–2 || 
|- align="center" bgcolor="#FFBBBB"
|18||L||November 15, 2005||1–4 || align="left"| @ Buffalo Sabres (2005–06) ||8–8–2 || 
|- align="center" bgcolor="#CCFFCC" 
|19||W||November 18, 2005||5–3 || align="left"|  Montreal Canadiens (2005–06) ||9–8–2 || 
|- align="center" bgcolor="#FFBBBB"
|20||L||November 19, 2005||4–5 || align="left"| @ Ottawa Senators (2005–06) ||9–9–2 || 
|- align="center" bgcolor="#CCFFCC" 
|21||W||November 23, 2005||5–1 || align="left"| @ Florida Panthers (2005–06) ||10–9–2 || 
|- align="center" bgcolor="#CCFFCC" 
|22||W||November 25, 2005||8–2 || align="left"| @ Tampa Bay Lightning (2005–06) ||11–9–2 || 
|- align="center" bgcolor="#CCFFCC" 
|23||W||November 29, 2005||3–2 || align="left"|  Boston Bruins (2005–06) ||12–9–2 || 
|- align="center" bgcolor="#FFBBBB"
|24||L||November 30, 2005||1–2 || align="left"| @ Philadelphia Flyers (2005–06) ||12–10–2 || 
|-

|- align="center" bgcolor="#CCFFCC" 
|25||W||December 3, 2005||3–2 SO|| align="left"|  Minnesota Wild (2005–06) ||13–10–2 || 
|- align="center" bgcolor="#FFBBBB"
|26||L||December 6, 2005||2–5 || align="left"| @ Detroit Red Wings (2005–06) ||13–11–2 || 
|- align="center" bgcolor="#FFBBBB"
|27||L||December 7, 2005||1–4 || align="left"|  Calgary Flames (2005–06) ||13–12–2 || 
|- align="center" 
|28||L||December 9, 2005||3–4 SO|| align="left"|  Colorado Avalanche (2005–06) ||13–12–3 || 
|- align="center" 
|29||L||December 11, 2005||2–3 OT|| align="left"| @ Columbus Blue Jackets (2005–06) ||13–12–4 || 
|- align="center" bgcolor="#CCFFCC" 
|30||W||December 13, 2005||2–1 SO|| align="left"|  Edmonton Oilers (2005–06) ||14–12–4 || 
|- align="center" 
|31||L||December 15, 2005||2–3 OT|| align="left"|  Atlanta Thrashers (2005–06) ||14–12–5 || 
|- align="center" bgcolor="#FFBBBB"
|32||L||December 17, 2005||1–4 || align="left"| @ Carolina Hurricanes (2005–06) ||14–13–5 || 
|- align="center" bgcolor="#CCFFCC" 
|33||W||December 20, 2005||3–1 || align="left"| @ New York Rangers (2005–06) ||15–13–5 || 
|- align="center" bgcolor="#FFBBBB"
|34||L||December 21, 2005||2–4 || align="left"| @ New York Islanders (2005–06) ||15–14–5 || 
|- align="center" bgcolor="#FFBBBB"
|35||L||December 23, 2005||0–1 || align="left"|  Atlanta Thrashers (2005–06) ||15–15–5 || 
|- align="center" bgcolor="#FFBBBB"
|36||L||December 26, 2005||1–2 || align="left"| @ Toronto Maple Leafs (2005–06) ||15–16–5 || 
|- align="center" bgcolor="#CCFFCC" 
|37||W||December 28, 2005||7–2 || align="left"|  Washington Capitals (2005–06) ||16–16–5 || 
|- align="center" bgcolor="#FFBBBB"
|38||L||December 29, 2005||2–6 || align="left"| @ Pittsburgh Penguins (2005–06) ||16–17–5 || 
|- align="center" bgcolor="#FFBBBB"
|39||L||December 31, 2005||3–6 || align="left"|  Toronto Maple Leafs (2005–06) ||16–18–5 || 
|-

|- align="center" bgcolor="#CCFFCC" 
|40||W||January 3, 2006||3–0 || align="left"|  Florida Panthers (2005–06) ||17–18–5 || 
|- align="center" bgcolor="#CCFFCC" 
|41||W||January 5, 2006||5–4 || align="left"|  Montreal Canadiens (2005–06) ||18–18–5 || 
|- align="center" bgcolor="#CCFFCC" 
|42||W||January 7, 2006||3–2 || align="left"| @ Buffalo Sabres (2005–06) ||19–18–5 || 
|- align="center" bgcolor="#CCFFCC" 
|43||W||January 9, 2006||3–0 || align="left"|  Philadelphia Flyers (2005–06) ||20–18–5 || 
|- align="center" bgcolor="#CCFFCC" 
|44||W||January 13, 2006||3–0 || align="left"|  Vancouver Canucks (2005–06) ||21–18–5 || 
|- align="center" bgcolor="#CCFFCC" 
|45||W||January 15, 2006||3–2 SO|| align="left"| @ Chicago Blackhawks (2005–06) ||22–18–5 || 
|- align="center" bgcolor="#CCFFCC" 
|46||W||January 17, 2006||5–3 || align="left"| @ St. Louis Blues (2005–06) ||23–18–5 || 
|- align="center" bgcolor="#CCFFCC" 
|47||W||January 19, 2006||4–3 SO|| align="left"| @ Nashville Predators (2005–06) ||24–18–5 || 
|- align="center" bgcolor="#CCFFCC" 
|48||W||January 21, 2006||3–2 SO|| align="left"|  New York Islanders (2005–06) ||25–18–5 || 
|- align="center" bgcolor="#FFBBBB"
|49||L||January 22, 2006||1–3 || align="left"| @ New York Rangers (2005–06) ||25–19–5 || 
|- align="center" bgcolor="#CCFFCC" 
|50||W||January 24, 2006||4–0 || align="left"| @ New York Islanders (2005–06) ||26–19–5 || 
|- align="center" 
|51||L||January 26, 2006||0–1 OT|| align="left"| @ Tampa Bay Lightning (2005–06) ||26–19–6 || 
|- align="center" bgcolor="#FFBBBB"
|52||L||January 27, 2006||0–4 || align="left"| @ Florida Panthers (2005–06) ||26–20–6 || 
|-

|- align="center" bgcolor="#CCFFCC" 
|53||W||February 1, 2006||5–3 || align="left"|  Ottawa Senators (2005–06) ||27–20–6 || 
|- align="center" bgcolor="#CCFFCC" 
|54||W||February 3, 2006||3–0 || align="left"|  Carolina Hurricanes (2005–06) ||28–20–6 || 
|- align="center" bgcolor="#FFBBBB"
|55||L||February 4, 2006||2–4 || align="left"| @ Toronto Maple Leafs (2005–06) ||28–21–6 || 
|- align="center" bgcolor="#CCFFCC" 
|56||W||February 7, 2006||7–4 || align="left"|  Tampa Bay Lightning (2005–06) ||29–21–6 || 
|- align="center" bgcolor="#CCFFCC" 
|57||W||February 9, 2006||3–2 OT|| align="left"| @ Boston Bruins (2005–06) ||30–21–6 || 
|- align="center" bgcolor="#FFBBBB"
|58||L||February 11, 2006||1–2 || align="left"|  New York Islanders (2005–06) ||30–22–6 || 
|-

|- align="center" bgcolor="#CCFFCC" 
|59||W||March 1, 2006||2–1 SO|| align="left"|  Philadelphia Flyers (2005–06) ||31–22–6 || 
|- align="center" 
|60||L||March 2, 2006||2–3 SO|| align="left"| @ New York Islanders (2005–06) ||31–22–7 || 
|- align="center" bgcolor="#CCFFCC" 
|61||W||March 4, 2006||2–1 || align="left"|  New York Rangers (2005–06) ||32–22–7 || 
|- align="center" 
|62||L||March 7, 2006||1–2 SO|| align="left"| @ New York Islanders (2005–06) ||32–22–8 || 
|- align="center" bgcolor="#CCFFCC" 
|63||W||March 10, 2006||4–3 SO|| align="left"| @ Washington Capitals (2005–06) ||33–22–8 || 
|- align="center" bgcolor="#FFBBBB"
|64||L||March 11, 2006||3–6 || align="left"| @ Pittsburgh Penguins (2005–06) ||33–23–8 || 
|- align="center" bgcolor="#FFBBBB"
|65||L||March 14, 2006||1–6 || align="left"|  New York Islanders (2005–06) ||33–24–8 || 
|- align="center" bgcolor="#CCFFCC" 
|66||W||March 16, 2006||2–1 || align="left"|  Pittsburgh Penguins (2005–06) ||34–24–8 || 
|- align="center" bgcolor="#FFBBBB"
|67||L||March 19, 2006||0–4 || align="left"|  Ottawa Senators (2005–06) ||34–25–8 || 
|- align="center" bgcolor="#FFBBBB"
|68||L||March 21, 2006||1–2 || align="left"| @ Philadelphia Flyers (2005–06) ||34–26–8 || 
|- align="center" 
|69||L||March 23, 2006||5–6 OT|| align="left"| @ Atlanta Thrashers (2005–06) ||34–26–9 || 
|- align="center" bgcolor="#CCFFCC" 
|70||W||March 24, 2006||4–2 || align="left"|  Boston Bruins (2005–06) ||35–26–9 || 
|- align="center" bgcolor="#FFBBBB"
|71||L||March 26, 2006||3–4 || align="left"|  Toronto Maple Leafs (2005–06) ||35–27–9 || 
|- align="center" bgcolor="#CCFFCC" 
|72||W||March 28, 2006||3–2 SO|| align="left"| @ Ottawa Senators (2005–06) ||36–27–9 || 
|- align="center" bgcolor="#CCFFCC" 
|73||W||March 30, 2006||3–1 || align="left"|  Buffalo Sabres (2005–06) ||37–27–9 || 
|-

|- align="center" bgcolor="#CCFFCC" 
|74||W||April 1, 2006||4–1 || align="left"| @ Philadelphia Flyers (2005–06) ||38–27–9 || 
|- align="center" bgcolor="#CCFFCC" 
|75||W||April 2, 2006||3–2 OT|| align="left"| @ Pittsburgh Penguins (2005–06) ||39–27–9 || 
|- align="center" bgcolor="#CCFFCC" 
|76||W||April 5, 2006||6–4 || align="left"|  Pittsburgh Penguins (2005–06) ||40–27–9 || 
|- align="center" bgcolor="#CCFFCC" 
|77||W||April 8, 2006||3–2 || align="left"| @ Montreal Canadiens (2005–06) ||41–27–9 || 
|- align="center" bgcolor="#CCFFCC" 
|78||W||April 9, 2006||3–2 || align="left"|  New York Rangers (2005–06) ||42–27–9 || 
|- align="center" bgcolor="#CCFFCC" 
|79||W||April 11, 2006||4–3 OT|| align="left"| @ Carolina Hurricanes (2005–06) ||43–27–9 || 
|- align="center" bgcolor="#CCFFCC" 
|80||W||April 13, 2006||4–1 || align="left"|  Philadelphia Flyers (2005–06) ||44–27–9 || 
|- align="center" bgcolor="#CCFFCC" 
|81||W||April 16, 2006||5–1 || align="left"|  Philadelphia Flyers (2005–06) ||45–27–9 || 
|- align="center" bgcolor="#CCFFCC" 
|82||W||April 18, 2006||4–3 || align="left"| @ Montreal Canadiens (2005–06) ||46–27–9 || 
|-

|-
| Legend:

Playoffs

|- align="center" bgcolor="#CCFFCC"
| 1 || April 22, 2006 || New York Rangers || 6–1 || 19,040 || Devils lead 1–0 || 
|- align="center" bgcolor="#CCFFCC"
| 2 || April 24, 2006 || New York Rangers || 4–1 || 19,040 || Devils lead 2–0 || 
|- align="center" bgcolor="#CCFFCC"
| 3 || April 26, 2006 || @ New York Rangers || 3–0 || 18,200 || Devils lead 3–0 || 
|- align="center" bgcolor="#CCFFCC"
| 4 || April 29, 2006 || @ New York Rangers || 4–2 || 18,200 || Devils win 4–0 || 
|-

|- align=center bgcolor="#FFBBBB"
| 1 || May 6, 2006 || @ Carolina Hurricanes || 0–6 || 18,730 || Hurricanes lead 1–0 || 
|- align=center bgcolor="#FFBBBB"
| 2 || May 8, 2006 || @ Carolina Hurricanes || 2–3 OT || 18,730 || Hurricanes lead 2–0 || 
|- align=center bgcolor="#FFBBBB"
| 3 || May 10, 2006 || Carolina Hurricanes || 2–3 || 16,862 || Hurricanes lead 3–0 || 
|- align=center bgcolor="#CCFFCC"
| 4 || May 13, 2006 || Carolina Hurricanes || 5–1 || 17,585 || Hurricanes lead 3–1 || 
|- align=center bgcolor="#FFBBBB"
| 5 || May 14, 2006 || @ Carolina Hurricanes || 1–4 || 18,730 || Hurricanes win 4–1 || 
|-

|-
| Legend:

Player statistics

Scoring
 Position abbreviations: C = Center; D = Defense; G = Goaltender; LW = Left Wing; RW = Right Wing
  = Joined team via a transaction (e.g., trade, waivers, signing) during the season. Stats reflect time with the Devils only.
  = Left team via a transaction (e.g., trade, waivers, release) during the season. Stats reflect time with the Devils only.

Goaltending

Awards and records

Awards
Martin Brodeur also finished second in voting for the Vezina Trophy.

Transactions
The Devils were involved in the following transactions from February 17, 2005, the day after the 2004–05 NHL season was officially cancelled, through June 19, 2006, the day of the deciding game of the 2006 Stanley Cup Finals.

Trades

Players acquired

Players lost

Signings

Draft picks
New Jersey's picks at the 2005 NHL Entry Draft at The Westin Ottawa in Ottawa, Ottawa.

Media
Television broadcasts were now under the Fox Sports Networks (aka FSN) with Mike Emrick commentating the play-by-play, Chico Resch serving as color commentator, and Matt Loughlin serving as the TV host. Radio broadcasts were now on WFAN (AM) 660 still called John Hennessy as play-by-play commentator with Randy Velischek as color commentator. This was Hennessy's final season as a radio play-by-play commentator for the Devils, as Loughlin took his place the following season. This was also Velischek's final season as a radio color commentator as Sherry Ross returned the following year.

See also
2005–06 NHL season

Notes

References

New Jersey Devils seasons
New Jersey Devils
New Jersey Devils
New Jersey Devils
New Jersey Devils
21st century in East Rutherford, New Jersey
Meadowlands Sports Complex